Caol and Mallaig is one of the 21 wards used to elect members of the Highland Council.  It includes the Caol area of the town of Fort William, Arisaig, the town of Mallaig, and the Small Isles. It elects four Councillors.

Councillors

Election Results

2022 Election
2022 Highland Council election

2018 By-election

2017 Election
2017 Highland Council election

2014 By-election

2012 Election
2012 Highland Council election

2007 Election
2007 Highland Council election

References

Highland council wards